Babur (14 February 148326 December 1530), born Zahīr ud-Dīn Muhammad, was the founder of the Mughal Empire in the Indian subcontinent. He was a descendant of Timur and Genghis Khan through his father and mother respectively. He was also given the posthumous name of Firdaws Makani ('Dwelling in Paradise').

Born in Andijan in the Fergana Valley (in present-day Uzbekistan), Babur was the eldest son of Umar Sheikh Mirza (1456–1494, governor of Fergana from 1469 to 1494) and a great-great-great grandson of Timur (1336–1405). Babur ascended the throne of Fergana in its capital Akhsikent in 1494 at the age of twelve and faced rebellion. He conquered Samarkand two years later, only to lose Fergana soon after. In his attempt to reconquer Fergana, he lost control of Samarkand. In 1501, his attempt to recapture both the regions failed when Muhammad Shaybani Khan defeated him. In 1504 he conquered Kabul, which was under the putative rule of Abdur Razaq Mirza, the infant heir of Ulugh Beg II. Babur formed a partnership with the Safavid ruler Ismail I and reconquered parts of Turkistan, including Samarkand, only to again lose it and the other newly conquered lands to the Sheybanids.

After losing Samarkand for the third time, Babur turned his attention to India and employed aid from the neighbouring Safavid and Ottoman empires. He defeated Ibrahim Lodi, Sultan of Delhi, at the First Battle of Panipat in 1526 CE and founded the Mughal Empire. At the time, the sultanate at Delhi was a spent force that was long crumbling. The Mewar kingdom, under the able rule of Rana Sanga, had turned into one of the strongest powers of northern India. Sanga unified several Rajput clans for the first time after Prithviraj Chauhan and advanced on Babur with a grand coalition of 100,000 Rajputs. However, Sanga suffered a major defeat in the Battle of Khanwa due to Babur's skillful positioning of troops and modern tactics and firepower. The Battle of Khanua was one of the most decisive battles in Indian history, more so than the First Battle of Panipat, as the defeat of Rana Sanga was a watershed event in the Mughal conquest of northern India.

Babur married several times. Notable among his sons are Humayun, Kamran Mirza and Hindal Mirza. Babur died in 1530 in Agra and Humayun succeeded him. Babur was first buried in Agra but, as per his wishes, his remains were moved to Kabul and reburied. He ranks as a national hero in Uzbekistan and Kyrgyzstan. Many of his poems have become popular folk songs. He wrote the Baburnama in Chaghatai Turkic; it was translated into Persian during the reign (1556–1605) of his grandson, the Emperor Akbar.

Name 
Ẓahīr-ud-Dīn is Arabic for "Defender of the Faith" (of Islam), and Muhammad honours the Islamic prophet. The name was chosen for Babur by the Sufi saint Khwaja Ahrar, who was the spiritual master of his father. The difficulty of pronouncing the name for his Central Asian Turco-Mongol army may have been responsible for the greater popularity of his nickname Babur, also variously spelled Baber, Babar, and Bābor. The name is generally taken in reference to the Persian word babur, meaning "tiger". The word repeatedly appears in Ferdowsi's Shahnameh and was borrowed into the Turkic languages of Central Asia.

Background 

Babur's memoirs form the main source for details of his life. They are known as the Baburnama and were written in Chaghatai Turkic, his mother-tongue, though, according to Dale, "his Turkic prose is highly Persianized in its sentence structure, morphology or word formation and vocabulary." Baburnama was translated into Persian during the rule of Babur's grandson Akbar.

Babur was born on 14 February 1483 in the city of Andijan, Fergana Valley, contemporary Uzbekistan. He was the eldest son of Umar Sheikh Mirza, ruler of the Fergana Valley, the son of Abū Saʿīd Mirza (and grandson of Miran Shah, who was himself son of Timur) and his wife Qutlugh Nigar Khanum, daughter of Yunus Khan, the ruler of Moghulistan (a descendant of Genghis Khan). 

Babur hailed from the Barlas tribe, which was of Mongol origin and had embraced Turkic and Persian culture. They had also converted to Islam centuries earlier and resided in Turkestan and Khorasan. Aside from the Chaghatai language, Babur was equally fluent in Persian, the lingua franca of the Timurid elite. Some of Babur's relatives, such as his uncle Mahmud Khan (Moghul Khan) and Ahmad Khan, continued to identify as Mongols, who loaned their nephews with Mongol troops to help him recover his fortunes in the turbulent years that followed.

Hence, Babur, though nominally a Mongol (or Moghul in Persian language), drew much of his support from the local Turkic and Iranian people of Central Asia, and his army was diverse in its ethnic makeup. It included Persians (known to Babur as "Sarts" and "Tajiks"), ethnic Afghans, Arabs, as well as Barlas and Chaghatayid Turko-Mongols from Central Asia.

Ruler of Central Asia

As ruler of Fergana 
In 1494, eleven-year-old Babur became the ruler of Fergana, in present-day Uzbekistan, after Umar Sheikh Mirza died "while tending pigeons in an ill-constructed dovecote that toppled into the ravine below the palace". During this time, two of his uncles from the neighbouring kingdoms, who were hostile to his father, and a group of nobles who wanted his younger brother Jahangir to be the ruler, threatened his succession to the throne. His uncles were relentless in their attempts to dislodge him from this position as well as from many of his other territorial possessions to come. Babur was able to secure his throne mainly because of help from his maternal grandmother, Aisan Daulat Begum, although there was also some luck involved.

Most territories around his kingdom were ruled by his relatives, who were descendants of either Timur or Genghis Khan, and were constantly in conflict. At that time, rival princes were fighting over the city of Samarkand to the west, which was ruled by his paternal cousin. Babur had a great ambition to capture the city. In 1497, he besieged Samarkand for seven months before eventually gaining control over it. He was fifteen years old and for him the campaign was a huge achievement. Babur was able to hold the city despite desertions in his army, but he later fell seriously ill. As he was marching to recover it, he lost Samarkand to a rival prince, leaving him with neither. He had held Samarkand for 100 days, and he considered this defeat as his biggest loss, obsessing over it even later in his life after his conquests in India.

For three years, Babur concentrated on building a strong army, recruiting widely amongst the Tajiks of Badakhshan in particular. In 1500–1501, he again laid siege to Samarkand, and indeed he took the city briefly, but he was in turn besieged by his most formidable rival, Muhammad Shaybani, Khan of the Uzbeks. The situation became such that Babar was compelled to give his sister, Khanzada, to Shaybani in marriage as part of the peace settlement. Only after this were Babur and his troops allowed to depart the city in safety. Samarkand, his lifelong obsession, was thus lost again. He then tried to reclaim Fergana, but lost the battle there also and, escaping with a small band of followers, he wandered the mountains of central Asia and took refuge with hill tribes. By 1502, he had resigned all hopes of recovering Fergana; he was left with nothing and was forced to try his luck elsewhere. He finally went to Tashkent, which was ruled by his maternal uncle, but he found himself less than welcome there. Babur wrote, "During my stay in Tashkent, I endured much poverty and humiliation. No country, or hope of one!" Thus, during the ten years since becoming the ruler of Fergana, Babur suffered many short-lived victories and was without shelter and in exile, aided by friends and peasants.

At Kabul 

Kabul was ruled by Babur's paternal uncle Ulugh Beg II, who died leaving only an infant as heir. The city was then claimed by Mukin Begh, who was considered to be a usurper and was opposed by the local populace. In 1504, Babur was able to cross the snowy Hindu Kush mountains and capture Kabul from the remaining Arghunids, who were forced to retreat to Kandahar. With this move, he gained a new kingdom, re-established his fortunes and would remain its ruler until 1526. In 1505, because of the low revenue generated by his new mountain kingdom, Babur began his first expedition to India; in his memoirs, he wrote, "My desire for Hindustan had been constant. It was in the month of Shaban, the Sun being in Aquarius, that we rode out of Kabul for Hindustan". It was a brief raid across the Khyber Pass.

In the same year, Babur united with Sultan Husayn Mirza Bayqarah of Herat, a fellow Timurid and distant relative, against their common enemy, the Uzbek Shaybani. However, this venture did not take place because Husayn Mirza died in 1506 and his two sons were reluctant to go to war. Babur instead stayed at Herat after being invited by the two Mirza brothers. It was then the cultural capital of the eastern Muslim world. Though he was disgusted by the vices and luxuries of the city, he marvelled at the intellectual abundance there, which he stated was "filled with learned and matched men". He became acquainted with the work of the Chagatai poet Mir Ali Shir Nava'i, who encouraged the use of Chagatai as a literary language. Nava'i's proficiency with the language, which he is credited with founding, may have influenced Babur in his decision to use it for his memoirs. He spent two months there before being forced to leave because of diminishing resources; it later was overrun by Shaybani and the Mirzas fled.
Babur became the only reigning ruler of the Timurid dynasty after the loss of Herat, and many princes sought refuge with him at Kabul because of Shaybani's invasion in the west. He thus assumed the title of Padshah (emperor) among the Timurids—though this title was insignificant since most of his ancestral lands were taken, Kabul itself was in danger and Shaybani continued to be a threat. Babur prevailed during a potential rebellion in Kabul, but two years later a revolt among some of his leading generals drove him out of Kabul. Escaping with very few companions, Babur soon returned to the city, capturing Kabul again and regaining the allegiance of the rebels. Meanwhile, Shaybani was defeated and killed by Ismail I, Shah of Shia Safavid Persia, in 1510.

Babur and the remaining Timurids used this opportunity to reconquer their ancestral territories. Over the following few years, Babur and Shah Ismail formed a partnership in an attempt to take over parts of Central Asia. In return for Ismail's assistance, Babur permitted the Safavids to act as a suzerain over him and his followers. Thus, in 1513, after leaving his brother Nasir Mirza to rule Kabul, he managed to take Samarkand for the third time; he also took Bokhara but lost both again to the Uzbeks. Shah Ismail reunited Babur with his sister Khānzāda, who had been imprisoned by and forced to marry the recently deceased Shaybani. Babur returned to Kabul after three years in 1514. The following 11 years of his rule mainly involved dealing with relatively insignificant rebellions from Afghan tribes, his nobles and relatives, in addition to conducting raids across the eastern mountains. Babur began to modernise and train his army despite it being, for him, relatively peaceful times.

Foreign relations 

Determined to conquer the Uzbeks and recapture his ancestral homeland, Babur was wary of their allies the Ottomans, and made no attempt to establish formal diplomatic relations with them. He did, however, employ the matchlock commander Mustafa Rumi and several other Ottomans. From them, he adopted the tactic of using matchlocks and cannons in the field (rather than only in sieges), which gave him an important advantage in India.

Formation of the Mughal Empire 

Babur still wanted to escape from the Uzbeks, and he chose India as a refuge instead of Badakhshan, which was to the north of Kabul. He wrote, "In the presence of such power and potency, we had to think of some place for ourselves and, at this crisis and in the crack of time there was, put a wider space between us and the strong foeman." After his third loss of Samarkand, Babur gave full attention to the conquest of North India, launching a campaign; he reached the Chenab River, now in Pakistan, in 1519. Until 1524, his aim was to only expand his rule to Punjab, mainly to fulfill the legacy of his ancestor Timur, since it used to be part of his empire. At the time parts of North India were part of the Delhi Sultanate, ruled by Ibrahim Lodi of the Lodi dynasty, but the sultanate was crumbling and there were many defectors. Babur received invitations from Daulat Khan Lodi, Governor of Punjab and Ala-ud-Din, uncle of Ibrahim. He sent an ambassador to Ibrahim, claiming himself the rightful heir to the throne, but the ambassador was detained at Lahore, Punjab, and released months later.

Babur started for Lahore in 1524 but found that Daulat Khan Lodi had been driven out by forces sent by Ibrahim Lodi. When Babur arrived at Lahore, the Lodi army marched out and his army was routed. In response, Babur burned Lahore for two days, then marched to Dibalpur, placing Alam Khan, another rebel uncle of Lodi, as governor. Alam Khan was quickly overthrown and fled to Kabul. In response, Babur supplied Alam Khan with troops who later joined up with Daulat Khan Lodi, and together with about 30,000 troops, they besieged Ibrahim Lodi at Delhi. The sultan easily defeated and drove off Alam's army, and Babur realised that he would not allow him to occupy the Punjab.

First battle of Panipat 

In November 1525 Babur got news at Peshawar that Daulat Khan Lodi had switched sides, and Babur drove out Ala-ud-Din. Babur then marched onto Lahore to confront Daulat Khan Lodi, only to see Daulat's army melt away at their approach. Daulat surrendered and was pardoned. Thus within three weeks of crossing the Indus River Babur had become the master of Punjab.

Babur marched on to Delhi via Sirhind. He reached Panipat on 20 April 1526 and there met Ibrahim Lodi's numerically superior army of about 100,000 soldiers and 100 elephants. In the battle that began on the following day, Babur used the tactic of Tulugma, encircling Ibrahim Lodi's army and forcing it to face artillery fire directly, as well as frightening its war elephants. Ibrahim Lodi died during the battle, thus ending the Lodi dynasty.

Babur wrote in his memoirs about his victory:

After the battle, Babur occupied Delhi and Agra, took the throne of Lodi, and laid the foundation for the eventual rise of Mughal rule in India. However, before he became North India's ruler, he had to fend off challengers, such as Rana Sanga.

Battle of Khanwa 

The Battle of Khanwa was fought between Babur and the Rajput ruler of Mewar, Rana Sanga on 16 March 1527. Rana Sanga wanted to overthrow Babur, whom he considered to be a foreigner ruling in India, and also to extend the Rajput territories by annexing Delhi and Agra. He was supported by Afghan chiefs who felt Babur had been deceptive by refusing to fulfil promises made to them. Upon receiving news of Rana Sangha's advance towards Agra, Babur took a defensive position at Khanwa (currently in the Indian state of Rajasthan), from where he hoped to launch a counterattack later. According to K.V. Krishna Rao, Babur won the battle because of his "superior generalship" and modern tactics; the battle was one of the first in India that featured cannons and muskets. Rao also notes that Rana Sanga faced "treachery" when the Hindu chief Silhadi joined Babur's army with a garrison of 6,000 soldiers.

Babur recognised Sanga's skill in leadership, calling him one of the two greatest non-Muslim Indian kings of the time, the other being Krishnadevaraya of Vijayanagara.

Battle of Chanderi 
The Battle of Chanderi took place the year after the Battle of Khanwa. On receiving news that Rana Sanga had made preparations to renew the conflict with him, Babur decided to isolate the Rana by defeating one of his staunchest allies, Medini Rai, who was the ruler of Malwa.

Upon reaching Chanderi, on 20 January 1528, Babur offered Shamsabad to Medini Rao in exchange for Chanderi as a peace overture, but the offer was rejected. The outer fortress of Chanderi was taken by Babur's army at night, and the next morning the upper fort was captured. Babur himself expressed surprise that the upper fort had fallen within an hour of the final assault. Seeing no hope of victory, Medini Rai organized a jauhar, during which women and children within the fortress immolated themselves. A small number of soldiers also collected in Medini Rao's house and killed each other in collective suicide. This sacrifice does not seem to have impressed Babur, who did not express a word of admiration for the enemy in his autobiography.

Religious policy
Babur defeated and killed Ibrahim Lodi, the last Sultan of the Lodi dynasty, in 1526. Babur ruled for 4 years and was succeeded by his son Humayun whose reign was temporarily usurped by the Suri dynasty. During their 30-year rule, religious violence continued in India. Records of the violence and trauma, from Sikh-Muslim perspective, include those recorded in Sikh literature of the 16th century. The violence of Babur in the 1520s was witnessed by Guru Nanak, who commented upon it in four hymns. Historians suggest the early Mughal period of religious violence contributed to introspection and then the transformation in Sikhism from pacifism to militancy for self-defense. According to Babur's autobiography, Baburnama, his campaign in northwest India targeted Hindus and Sikhs as well as apostates (non-Sunni sects of Islam), and an immense number were killed, with Muslim camps building "towers of skulls of the infidels" on hillocks.

Personal life and relationships 
There are no descriptions about Babur's physical appearance, except from the paintings in the translation of the Baburnama prepared during the reign of Akbar. In his autobiography, Babur claimed to be strong and physically fit, and that he had swum across every major river he encountered, including twice across the Ganges River in North India.

Babur did not initially know old Hindustani; however, his Turkic poetry indicates that he picked up some of its vocabulary later in life.

Unlike his father, he had ascetic tendencies and did not have any great interest in women. In his first marriage, he was "bashful" towards Aisha Sultan Begum, later losing his affection for her. Babur showed similar shyness in his interactions with Baburi, a boy in his camp with whom he had an infatuation around this time, recounting that: "Occasionally Baburi came to me, but I was so bashful that I could not look him in the face, much less converse freely with him. In my excitement and agitation I could not thank him for coming, much less complain of his leaving. Who could bear to demand the ceremonies of fealty?" However, Babur acquired several more wives and concubines over the years, and as required for a prince, he was able to ensure the continuity of his line.

Babur's first wife, Aisha Sultan Begum, was his paternal cousin, the daughter of Sultan Ahmad Mirza, his father's brother. She was an infant when betrothed to Babur, who was himself five years old. They married eleven years later, . The couple had one daughter, Fakhr-un-Nissa, who died within a year in 1500. Three years later, after Babur's first defeat at Fergana, Aisha left him and returned to her father's household. In 1504, Babur married Zaynab Sultan Begum, who died childless within two years. In the period 1506–08, Babur married four women, Maham Begum (in 1506), Masuma Sultan Begum, Gulrukh Begum and Dildar Begum. Babur had four children by Maham Begum, of whom only one survived infancy. This was his eldest son and heir, Humayun. Masuma Sultan Begum died during childbirth; the year of her death is disputed (either 1508 or 1519). Gulrukh bore Babur two sons, Kamran and Askari, and Dildar Begum was the mother of Babur's youngest son, Hindal. Babur later married Mubaraka Yusufzai, a Pashtun woman of the Yusufzai tribe. Gulnar Aghacha and Nargul Aghacha were two Circassian slaves given to Babur as gifts by Tahmasp Shah Safavi, the Shah of Persia. They became "recognized ladies of the royal household."

During his rule in Kabul, when there was a time of relative peace, Babur pursued his interests in literature, art, music and gardening. Previously, he never drank alcohol and avoided it when he was in Herat. In Kabul, he first tasted it at the age of thirty. He then began to drink regularly, host wine parties and consume preparations made from opium. Though religion had a central place in his life, Babur also approvingly quoted a line of poetry by one of his contemporaries: "I am drunk, officer. Punish me when I am sober". He quit drinking for health reasons before the Battle of Khanwa, just two years before his death, and demanded that his court do the same. But he did not stop chewing narcotic preparations, and did not lose his sense of irony. He wrote, "Everyone regrets drinking and swears an oath (of abstinence); I swore the oath and regret that."

Babur was opposed to the blind obedience towards the Chinggisid laws and customs that were influential in Turco-Mongol society:"Previously our ancestors had shown unusual respect for the Chingizid code. They did not violate this code sitting and rising at councils and court, at feasts and dinners. [However] Chingez Khan’s code is not a nass qati (categorical text) that a person must follow. Whenever one leaves a good custom, it should be followed. If ancestors leave a bad custom, however it is necessary to substitute a good one."Making clear that to him, the categorical text (i.e. the Quran) had displaced Genghis Khan's Yassa in moral and legal matters.

Poetry 

Babur was an acclaimed writer, who had a profound love for literature. His library was one of his most beloved possessions that he always carried around with him, and books were one of the treasures he searched for in new conquered lands. In his memoirs, when he listed sovereigns and nobles of a conquered land, he also mentioned poets, musicians and other educated people.
 
During his 47-year life, Babur left a rich literary and scientific heritage. He authored his famous memoir the Bāburnāma, as well as beautiful lyrical works or ghazals, treatises on Muslim jurisprudence (Mubayyin), poetics (Aruz risolasi), music, and a special calligraphy, known as khatt-i Baburi.

Babur's Bāburnāma is a collection of memoirs, written in the Chagatai language and later translated into Persian, the usual literary language of the Mughal court, during the rule of emperor Akbar. However, Babur's Turkic prose in Bāburnāma is already highly Persianized in its sentence structure, vocabulary, and morphology, and also consists of several phrases and minor poems in Persian.

Babur wrote most of his poems in Chagatai Turkic, known to him as Türki, but he also composed in Persian. However, he was mostly praised for his literary works written in Turkic, which drew comparison with the poetry of Ali-Shir Nava'i. 

The following ruba'i is an example of Babur's poetry written in Turkic, composed in the aftermath of his famous victory in North India to celebrate his ghazi status.

I am become a desert wanderer for Islam,
Having joined battle with infidels and Hindus
I readied myself to become a martyr,
God be thanked I am become a ghazi.

Family

Consorts 
Aisha Sultan Begum ( 1499;  1503), daughter of Sultan Ahmed Mirza — First wife of Babur
Zainab Sultan Begum ( 1504;  1506–07), daughter of Sultan Mahmud Mirza
Maham Begum ( 1506) — Babur's chief and favourite consort
Masuma Sultan Begum ( 1507;  1509), daughter of Sultan Ahmed Mirza and half-sister of Aisha Sultan Begum
Bibi Mubarika ( 1519), Pashtun of the Yusufzai tribe
Gulrukh Begum (not to be confused with Babur's daughter Gulrukh Begum, who was also known as Gulbarg Begum)
Dildar Begum
Gulnar Aghacha, Circassian concubine
Nargul Aghacha, Circassian concubine

The identity of the mother of one of Babur's daughters, Gulrukh Begum is disputed. Gulrukh's mother may have been the daughter of Sultan Mahmud Mirza by his wife Pasha Begum who is referred to as Saliha Sultan Begum in certain secondary sources, however this name is not mentioned in the Baburnama or the works of Gulbadan Begum, which casts doubt on her existence. This woman may never have existed at all or she may even be the same woman as Dildar Begum.

Issue 
The sons of Babur were:

Humayun ( 1508;  1556) — with Maham Begum — succeeded Babur as the second Mughal Emperor
Kamran Mirza ( 1512;   1557) — with Gulrukh Begum
Askari Mirza ( 1518;  1557) — with Gulrukh Begum
Hindal Mirza ( 1519;  1551) — with Dildar Begum
Ahmad Mirza ( young) — with Gulrukh Begum
Shahrukh Mirza ( young) — with Gulrukh Begum
Barbul Mirza ( infancy) — with Maham Begum
Alwar Mirza ( young) — with Dildar Begum
Faruq Mirza ( infancy) — with Maham Begum

The daughters of Babur were:
Fakhr-un-Nissa Begum ( &  1501) — with Aisha Sultan Begum
Aisan Daulat Begum ( infancy) — with Maham Begum
Mehr Jahan Begum ( infancy) — with Maham Begum
Masuma Sultan Begum ( 1508) — with Masuma Sultan Begum — Married to Muhammad Zaman Mirza.
Gulzar Begum ( infancy) — with Gulrukh Begum
Gulrukh Begum (Gulbarg Begum) —  Identity of mother is disputed, may have been Dildar Begum or Saliha Sultan Begum — Married to Nuruddin Muhammad Mirza, son of Khwaja Hasan Naqshbandi, with whom she had Salima Sultan Begum, wife of Bairam Khan and later the Mughal Emperor Akbar.
Gulbadan Begum (  –  1603) — with Dildar Begum — Married Khizr Khwaja Khan, son of her father's cousin Aiman Khwajah Sultan of Moghulistan, son of Ahmad Alaq of Moghulistan, the maternal uncle of Emperor Babur.
Gulchehra Begum (  –  1557) — with Dildar Begum — Married firstly in 1530 to Sultan Tukhta Bugha Khan, son of Ahmad Alaq of Moghulistan, the maternal uncle of Emperor Babur. Married secondly to Abbas Sultan Uzbeg.
Gulrang Begum — with Dildar Begum — Married in 1530 to Isan Timur Sultan, ninth son of Ahmad Alaq of Moghulistan, the maternal uncle of Emperor Babur.

Death and legacy 

He was first buried in Agra but, as per his wishes, his mortal remains were moved to Kabul and reburied in Bagh-e Babur in Kabul sometime between 1539 and 1544.

It is generally agreed that, as a Timurid, Babur was not only significantly influenced by the Persian culture, but also that his empire gave rise to the expansion of the Persianate ethos in the Indian subcontinent. He emerged in his own telling as a Timurid Renaissance inheritor, leaving signs of Islamic, artistic literary, and social aspects in India.

For example, F. Lehmann states in the Encyclopædia Iranica:
Although all applications of modern Central Asian ethnicities to people of Babur's time are anachronistic, Soviet and Uzbek sources regard Babur as an ethnic Uzbek. At the same time, during the Soviet Union Uzbek scholars were censored for idealising and praising Babur and other historical figures such as Ali-Shir Nava'i.

Babur is considered a national hero in Uzbekistan. On 14 February 2008, stamps in his name were issued in the country to commemorate his 525th birth anniversary. Many of Babur's poems have become popular Uzbek folk songs, especially by Sherali Jo'rayev. Some sources claim that Babur is a national hero in Kyrgyzstan too. In October 2005, Pakistan developed the Babur Cruise Missile, named in his honour.

Shahenshah Babar, an Indian film about the emperor directed by Wajahat Mirza was released in 1944. The 1960 Indian biographical film Babar by Hemen Gupta covered the emperor's life with Gajanan Jagirdar in the lead role.

One of the enduring features of Babur's life was that he left behind the lively and well-written autobiography known as Baburnama. Quoting Henry Beveridge, Stanley Lane-Poole writes:

In his own words, "The cream of my testimony is this, do nothing against your brothers even though they may deserve it." Also, "The new year, the spring, the wine and the beloved are joyful. Babur make merry, for the world will not be there for you a second time."

Babri Masjid 
The Babri Masjid ("Babur's Mosque") in Ayodhya is said to have been constructed on the orders of Mir Baqi, one of the commanders of his army. In 2003 the Allahabad High Court ordered the Archaeological Survey of India (ASI) to conduct a more in-depth study and an excavation to ascertain the type of structure beneath the mosque. The excavation was conducted from 12 March 2003 to 7 August 2003, resulting in 1360 discoveries.

The summary of the ASI report indicated the presence of a 10th-century temple under the mosque. The ASI team said that, human activity at the site dates back to the 13th century BCE. The next few layers date back to the Shunga period (second-first century BCE) and the Kushan period. During the early medieval period (11–12th century CE), a huge but short-lived structure of nearly 50 metres north–south orientation was constructed. On the remains of this structure, another massive structure was constructed: this structure had at least three structural phases and three successive floors attached with it. The report concluded that it was over the top of this construction that the disputed structure was constructed during the early 16th century. Archaeologist KK Muhammed, the only Muslim member in the team of people surveying the excavation, also confirmed individually that there existed a temple like structure before the Babri Masjid was constructed over it. The Supreme Court judgement of 2019 granted the entire disputed land to the Hindus for construction of a temple, stating that hindus continues to worship at the site and continued to hold the land outside the yard. It also held that there is nothing to prove that the structure, which was present before the construction of the mosque, was demolished for the purpose of building mosque or was already in ruins.

Citations

References

Books
 
 Thackston Jr., W.M., The Baburnama, (New York) 2010.
 
 Gascoigne, Bamber The Great Moghuls (London) 1971. (Last revised 1987)
 Gommans, Jos Mughal Warfare (London) 2002
 Gordon, Stewart. When Asia was the World: Traveling Merchants, Scholars, Warriors, and Monks who created the "Riches of the East" Da Capo Press, Perseus Books, 2008. .
 
 Irvine, William The Army of the Indian Moghuls. (London) 1902. (Last revised 1985)
 Jackson, Peter The Delhi Sultanate. A Political and Military History (Cambridge) 1999
 Richards, John F. The Mughal Empire (Cambridge) 1993

External links 

 
 
 

 
1483 births
1530 deaths
People from Andijan
1530 in India
Timurid dynasty
Indian people of Turkic descent
16th-century Indian monarchs
15th-century Indian monarchs
Turkic rulers
Indian Sunni Muslims
Muslim monarchs
Mughal emperors
16th-century Indian Muslims
Turkic culture
Founding monarchs
15th-century Turkic people
16th-century Turkic people